Reginald Binns Rickman (6 May 1881 – 22 November 1940) was a British Army officer and cricketer who played first-class cricket for Derbyshire between 1906 and 1911 and captained the side in 1908 and 1909.

Family
Rickman was born at Doncaster, Yorkshire, the son of Samuel Rickman and his wife Emily Rachel Binns, daughter of Charles Binns manager of the Clay Cross Company. The family lived in Devon, and Rickman's first games were Minor Counties matches for Devon in 1901 and 1903.

Cricket
In the 1906 season, Rickman made his debut for Derbyshire in an uninspiring performance against Lancashire in May. He continued to play in 1907 and in 1908 was captain in a season which saw Derbyshire move up to third from the bottom in the County Championship. He captained again in the 1909 season but the team slipped a notch in the table. He played seven games in the  1910 season but appeared in his last single game in the 1911 season. Rickman was a right hand batsman and played 65 matches for the club and 118 innings. His highest score was 68 and he averaged 11.47. He was a right arm medium bowler and took 62 wickets at an average of 31.72.

Military career
Rickman was commissioned as a second lieutenant in the 3rd (Militia) Battalion, the Sherwood Foresters (Derbyshire Regiment) on 4 September 1900, and was promoted to a lieutenant on 19 March 1902. He served in the Second Boer War in South Africa, where he took part in operations in Orange River Colony. After the end of the war in June 1902, he returned home on the SS Harlech Castle in September that year. In May 1904 he transferred to the 3rd (Militia) Battalion, the Cheshire Regiment. He later served in the First World War, and became a lieutenant colonel.

He died at Chelsea, London at the age of 61.

References

1881 births
1940 deaths
English cricketers
Derbyshire cricket captains
Devon cricketers
People educated at Sherborne School
British Army personnel of the Second Boer War
British Army personnel of World War I
Sherwood Foresters officers
Cheshire Regiment officers